Gran Hermano VIP (as known by the acronym GH VIP) is a reality television series broadcast in Spain on Telecinco produced by Endemol. It is the celebrity version of Gran Hermano and part of the Big Brother franchise first developed in the Netherlands. The first edition of the program was broadcast in 2004. As of September 2019, 7 editions of the show have aired.

Format
The mechanic of the contest is essentially the same as the original Big Brother. A number of different Housemates, celebrities with different degrees of fame, are locked up together in a house, where the viewing public can watch them and vote them out of the House as they choose to. The housemates live in isolation from the outside world in a house custom built with everyday objects, like fridges and a garden. The house also includes cameras and microphones in most of the rooms to record all of the activity in the house. The only place where Housemates can be away from the other contestants is in the Diary Room, where they can express their true feelings. The winner is the last contestant remaining in the house and receives a large cash prize. Housemates are evicted weekly throughout the show by the viewing public.

Season details

Presenters and programmes

Current presenters
Jorge Javier Vázquez - presents the main gala shows and límite 48 horas show for Gran Hermano VIP 6-7.
Jordi González - presents main gala shows for Gran Hermano VIP 3-5, the weekly debate show for Gran Hermano VIP 2-3, 7, the weekly límite 48 horas show for Gran Hermano VIP 4-5 and main gala shows for Gran Hermano VIP 7 (Gala 14 and 15)
Lara Álvarez - presents the weekly última hora show for Gran Hermano VIP 5-7 and the daily highlights for Gran Hermano VIP 7 
Carlos Sobera - presents the límite 24 horas show for Gran Hermano VIP 7 (Show 12-Final)

Former presenters
Jesús Vázquez - presented the main gala shows for Gran Hermano VIP 1-2 
Carolina Ferre - presented the weekly debate show for Gran Hermano VIP 1 
Jorge Fernández - presented the daily highlights for Gran Hermano VIP 1
Óscar Martínez - presented the daily highlights for Gran Hermano VIP 2 
Sandra Barneda - presented the weekly debate show for Gran Hermano VIP 4–6

References

External links
 Gran Hermano VIP Official website on Telecinco

Gran Hermano (Spanish TV series)
Telecinco original programming
2004 Spanish television series debuts
Spanish reality television series
Spanish television series based on non-Spanish television series